is a Japanese photographer.

References

1922 births
Possibly living people
Japanese photographers